Love Like the Galaxy is a 2022 Chinese television series based on the novel, "Xing Han Can Lan, Xing Shen Zhi Zai" (星汉灿烂, 幸甚至哉) by Guan Xin Ze Luan (关心则乱). It stars Wu Lei and Zhao Lusi. The series is split into two parts, with first part starting on July 5, 2022. The second part premiered on July 27, 2022.

Plot 
The story revolves around Cheng Shaoshang, who was left behind by her parents when they went to war. As a result, she was raised by her scheming aunt and ignorant grandmother. In order to protect herself from the constant abuse and mistreatment, she honed herself to be extra diligent.

The plot starts with the return of Shaoshang's parents. At first, she hopes that her life will improve after reuniting with them. However, years of estrangement have made it difficult for them to become family. As she lacked love her whole life, Cheng Shaoshang is both pragmatic and insecure when it comes to opening up her feelings to others.

She soon meets the emperor's adopted son, Ling Buyi, whom she views as a cold and ruthless person in the beginning. However, that notion changes as she continually finds herself involved with him. Through her interactions with Ling Buyi, she unintentionally becomes involved in the mystery surrounding his family and his identity.

Cast

Main cast 
Wu Lei as Ling Buyi / Zisheng 
 Wang Hanzhe as young Ling Buyi
 Zhao Lusi as Cheng Shaoshang / Niaoniao
 Li Zhimo as young Cheng Shaoshang

Supporting cast 
 Li Yunrui as Yuan Shen / Shanjian
 Huangfu Yi's disciple. Has the reputation of No. 1 scholar from Bailu Mountain Academy. Became enamored with Cheng Shaoshang when she answered his Lantern Festival riddle correctly. Tends to bicker with Cheng Shaoshang every time they meet each other, but also finds her fascinating. Love rival of Ling Buyi and Lou Yao.
 Yu Cheng'en as Lou Yao
 Second son of the second Lou family branch. Was the childhood fiancé of He Zhaojun, but the engagement was broken off. Became enamored with Cheng Shaoshang and followed her to Hua County. Love rival of Ling Buyi and Yuan Shanjian. Originally timid and weak in temperament due to abusive upbringing. Ultimately marries He Zhaojun.
 Estelle Chen as He Zhaojun
 Youngest daughter of Calvary General He Yong. Was the childhood fiancée of Lou Yao, but broke off the engagement due to her disdain for Lou Yao's temperament. Married and was granted the honour of beheading Prince Xiao. Remarried to Lou Yao in order to protect her family's assets on behalf of her younger brother.
 Zhang Yue as Wan Qiqi, General Wan’s daughter and family friend of Niaoniao and Yangyang.
 Cui Enci as Princess Yuchang
 Enamored with Ling Buyi. Willing to resort to unscrupulous tactics in order to become Ling Buyi's woman.
Cheng Family
 Guo Tao as Cheng Shi/Marquis Quling
 Cheng Shaoshang's father.
 Zeng Li as Xiao Yuanyi
 Cheng Shaoshang's mother.
 Xu Jiao as Cheng Yang / Yangyang
 Cheng Shaoshang's cousin.
 Xu Di as Old Madam Cheng
 Cheng Shaoshang's grandmother.
 Mickey Zhao as Cheng Shaogong
 Cheng Shaoshang's twin brother.
 Jiang Yiming as Cheng Song
 Cheng Shaoshang's second brother, who is in love with Wan Qiqi.
 Zhang Tianyang as Cheng Zhi
 Cheng Shaoshang's third uncle.
 Peng Yang as Sang Shunhua
 Cheng Zhi's wife and Cheng Shaoshang's third aunt.
 Cui Peng as Cheng Cheng
 Cheng Yang's father and Cheng Shaoshang's second uncle.
 Chen Sisi as Madam Ge
 Cheng Yang's mother and Cheng Shaoshang's second aunt.
Royal Family
 Bao Jianfeng as Emperor Wen
 Tong Lei as Empress Xuan
 Cao Xiwen as Consort Yue / Empress Yue
 Mother of Second Princess, Third Prince, and Third Princess
 Wang Zhuocheng as Crown Prince Yuan
 Considered too soft hearted and weak willed to be able to lead as the future emperor.
 Wang Ziwei as Fifth Princess
 Spoiled and pampered due to being the youngest and only child born to the Emperor and Empress after the establishment of the current kingdom. She considers herself the ONLY legitimate daughter of the Emperor and Empress despite all her siblings being equally legitimate.
 Fang Xiaoli as Princess Consort Ruyang
 Aunt of Emperor Wen
 Gao Han as Third Prince
 Ambitious and decisive.
 Wang Zhen as Third Princess
 Consort Yue's daughter, grew up under Young Marquis Yue's tutelage. Prioritises wealth and prestige over her half-siblings.
 Kobe Liu as Fifth Prince
 A playboy and considered unfit to help with any imperial/official issues.
 Li Yanman as Fifth Princess Consort
Ling Family
 Sha Baoliang as Ling Yi / Marquis Chengyang (Villain)
 Ling Buyi's father - Conspired with Former Emperor Li in orchestrating the downfall of Huo clan as well as Gu City.
 Candy Zhang as Huo Junhua
 Ling Buyi's mother - Suffered from a mental breakdown after the massacre of Gu City. Believes she is 15yo and unmarried. 
 Zhao Ziqi as Madam Chunyu
 Ling Buyi's step-mother - Cousin of Ling Yi. Took advantage of Huo Junhua and Ling Buyi's absence to begin an affair with Ling Yi; in order to usurp Huo Junhua's position as the legitimate wife. Knew of Ling Yi's betrayal but would not expose it due to her own greed.
Others
 Gu Kejia as Qing Cong
 Xiao Yuanyi's sworn sister.
 Zhang Chen as Liang Qiuqi
 Ling Buyi's subordinate.
 Sun Kai as Liang Qiufei
 Ling Buyi's subordinate.
 Hu Jiaxin as Wang Ling
 Empress Xuan's niece and Peng Kun's wife.
 Melody Tang as Lou Li
 Lou Yao's cousin.
 Xing Minshan as Grand Tutor Lou
 Lou Yao's first uncle.
 Sheng Guansen as Prince Xiao (villain)
 Prince Yong's son. Planned a rebellion against the Emperor with his father and Mid-Shu County. Murdered He Zhaojun's nanny on the day of his and He Zhaojun's wedding because she would not reveal where He Zhaojun and General He's youngest son was hiding. Intended to hold both as hostages to coerce General He to participate in the rebellion.

TV Soundtrack

Chinese Mainland

Reception
The highest single-day streaming viewership of the first part of "Love Like the Galaxy" exceeded 200 million views.
As of August 2 of the same year, the 2nd part of the series had a single-day maximum streaming viewership of 300 million views.

Differences from the original novel
In the original novel, Wang Jie married a noble family in Jiangxia, Jingzhou, and was regarded as a "good wife" by the locals. The plot in the play is to marry Peng Kun far away, and then Peng Kun was finally silenced by Ling Yi, causing Wang Ji to become a lonely widow.
In the original work, Wen Xiujun was given death at the end, but in the play it was a nervous breakdown.
In the original novel, Chunyu and the boy both took poison and committed suicide. In the play, it is life without a descendant, lonely and helpless, and finally mentally abnormal, pretending to be crazy and acting stupid, just to survive.

References 

2020s Chinese television series debuts
2022 Chinese television series debuts
2022 Chinese television series endings
Television shows based on Chinese novels
Chinese novels adapted into television series
Television series by Tencent Penguin Pictures
Tencent original programming
Chinese romantic fantasy television series